Made in Chelsea: Ibiza, a spin-off series of Made in Chelsea, a British structured-reality television programme, was confirmed on 11 April 2017 and began airing on 31 July 2017. The series concluded on 4 September 2017 after six episodes. It was announced that the cast of Made in Chelsea would be travelling to Ibiza to film a special series of the show. It was revealed that this would be a stand-alone series which would not be promoted as the fourteenth series. The fourteenth series followed in October 2017. This is the fourth spin-off show filmed away from Chelsea following NYC in 2014, LA in 2015, and South of France in 2016. 

The cast for the series was revealed on 19 July 2017, and only features some of the Made in Chelsea cast, with notable absences from Francis Boulle, Fredrik Ferrier, Oliver Proudlock, Rosie Fortescue and Stephanie Pratt. Despite announcing they'd left the show, Alexandra "Binky" Felstead and Josh "JP" Patterson made a brief appearance during the third episode during a video chat with some of the cast. The series focused heavily on the final nail in the coffin for Sam T and Tiff's turbulent relationship following their attempt at taking a break, as well as Jamie and Frankie both realising that they're better off apart. It also included the rivalry between Olivia and Julius escalating, and Sam P betraying Toff one too many times.

Cast

Episodes

{| class="wikitable plainrowheaders" style="width:100%; background:#fff;"
|- style="color:black"
! style="background: #FFD97A;"| SeriesNo.
! style="background: #FFD97A;"| EpisodeNo.
! style="background: #FFD97A;"| Title
! style="background: #FFD97A;"| Original airdate
! style="background: #FFD97A;"| Duration
! style="background: #FFD97A;"| UK viewers

|}

Ratings

References

External links
 

2017 British television seasons
British reality television series
British television spin-offs
Ibiza
Ibiza
Television shows set in Spain